WKHR (91.5 FM) – branded WKHR FM 91.5 – is a non-commercial educational adult standards/MOR radio station licensed to Bainbridge, Ohio.  Owned by the Kenston Local School District, the station serves Geauga County and eastern parts of Greater Cleveland.  The WKHR studios are located at Kenston Middle School in Bainbridge township, while the station transmitter resides in Newbury township.

History
WKHR first went on the air on May 1, 1977, broadcasting at 88.3 MHz.  The station originated as a high school broadcast class under the direction of Marilyn Teague at Kenston High School on May 6, 1977.  Initially, WKHR broadcast with only 10 watts of power and featured a rock music format; the station was managed by both students and staff.  By 1983 the station's power increased to 300 watts.  In 1990, WKHR was reorganized under a nonprofit company, WKHR Radio, Inc.; over time, the station transitioned from a student-run alternative rock station to a big band station run by adult volunteers.

In May 1995, the station received permission from the FCC to increase its power to 1000 watts. The increased power along with an improved antenna in Newbury township allowed WKHR to be heard for the first time throughout the eastern portion of the Cleveland market.  In September 1995, WKHR  moved from 88.3 MHz to 91.5 MHz to avoid interference with WBWC/Berea; the move was part of a two-way frequency swap with WSTB/Streetsboro.

Current programming
WKHR broadcasts 24 hours a day, seven days a week; on air personalities include a mix of adult volunteers and students of Kenston High School. The station plays big band, swing, jazz and pop standards from the 1920s to the 1960s.

References

External links

1977 establishments in Ohio
Adult standards radio stations in the United States
Radio stations established in 1977
KHR